Bugiardini is an Italian surname. Notable people with the surname include:

Agostino Bugiardini (died 1623), Italian sculptor
Giuliano Bugiardini (1475–1577), Italian painter and draughtsman

Italian-language surnames